Wilburton may refer to:

Places
England
Wilburton, Cambridgeshire, England
United States
Wilburton, Oklahoma, United States
Wilburton, Kansas, United States
Wilburton, Washington, United States

See also
Wilburton station (disambiguation)